Maida Arslanagić (born 20 April 1984) is a retired Bosnian-Croatian handball player. She is daughter of the famous former handball goalkeeper Abaz Arslanagić.

She played more than 100 games for the Croatia women's national handball team between 1999 and 2012, including the 2008 European Women's Handball Championship, where Croatia finished 6th.

References

External links

1984 births
Living people
Croatian female handball players
Olympic handball players of Croatia
Handball players from Zagreb
Mediterranean Games medalists in handball
Mediterranean Games bronze medalists for Croatia
Competitors at the 2005 Mediterranean Games
Bosniaks of Croatia